Schorlemer is a surname. Notable people with the surname include:

 Burghard Freiherr von Schorlemer-Alst (1825–1895), German politician
 Clemens Freiherr von Schorlemer-Lieser (1856–1922), German politician
 Reinhard von Schorlemer (born 1938), politician, member for the Bundestag, forester and farmer

German-language surnames